The Stack Barn is an unusual and historic barn in Benton County, Arkansas. Built in 1901, the barn's features are an amalgam of styles found from Pennsylvania to the American South. It is rectangular in shape, with a tin gabled roof that has a slight projection near the top at one end (a hay hood), and board-and-batten siding. Unlike typical Arkansas barns, it is set on slope with a stone foundation, creating a bank barn with an accessible basement more typical of northeastern barns, and necessitating a proper floor (rather than dirt) for the main level. The interior is laid out like a fairly typical 19th-century midwestern three-portal barn.

The barn was listed on the National Register of Historic Places in 1988.

See also
National Register of Historic Places listings in Benton County, Arkansas

References

Barns on the National Register of Historic Places in Arkansas
Buildings and structures completed in 1901
National Register of Historic Places in Benton County, Arkansas
1901 establishments in Arkansas
Barns with hay hoods
Bank barns